The 1997 Canadian Olympic Curling Trials were held from November 22 to 30, 1997 at the Keystone Centre in Brandon, Manitoba. They were held to determine the Canadian National men's and women's Teams for the 1998 Winter Olympics.

Men

Teams

Final standings

Playoffs

Semi-final

Final

Women

Teams

Final standings

Playoffs

Semi-final

Final

Sources

2017 Canadian Olympic Curling Trials Media Guide: 1997 Trials

Canadian
Olympic Curling Trials, 1997
Canadian Olympic Curling Trials
1997 in Manitoba